Ridgecrest is a census-designated place (CDP) in Pinellas County, Florida, United States. The population was 2,558 at the 2010 census.

Geography
Ridgecrest is located at  (27.895767, -82.804786).

According to the United States Census Bureau, the CDP has a total area of 1.5 km (0.6 mi2), of which 1.5 km (0.6 mi2) is land and 1.75% is water.

Demographics

As of the census of 2000, there were 2,453 people, 781 households, and 623 families residing in the CDP.  The population density was 1,691.3/km (4,354.6/mi2).  There were 862 housing units at an average density of 594.3/km (1,530.2/mi2).  The racial makeup of the CDP was 16.23% White, 80.64% African American, 0.08% Native American, 0.16% Asian, 0.98% from other races, and 1.92% from two or more races. Hispanic or Latino of any race were 3.18% of the population.

There were 781 households, out of which 39.4% had children under the age of 18 living with them, 32.5% were married couples living together, 41.6% had a female householder with no husband present, and 20.2% were non-families. 15.7% of all households were made up of individuals, and 6.9% had someone living alone who was 65 years of age or older.  The average household size was 3.13 and the average family size was 3.51.

In the CDP, the population was spread out, with 36.9% under the age of 18, 8.8% from 18 to 24, 24.8% from 25 to 44, 20.3% from 45 to 64, and 9.2% who were 65 years of age or older.  The median age was 29 years. For every 100 females, there were 80.9 males.  For every 100 females age 18 and over, there were 69.4 males.

The median income for a household in the CDP was $32,535, and the median income for a family was $26,591. Males had a median income of $26,850 versus $20,664 for females. The per capita income for the CDP was $13,290.  About 20.1% of families and 22.7% of the population were below the poverty line, including 35.4% of those under age 18 and 11.0% of those age 65 or over.

References

Unincorporated communities in Pinellas County, Florida
Census-designated places in Pinellas County, Florida
Census-designated places in Florida
Unincorporated communities in Florida